An execution warrant (also called death warrant or black warrant) is a writ that authorizes the execution of a condemned person. An execution warrant is not to be confused with a "license to kill", which operates like an arrest warrant but with deadly force instead of arrest as the end goal.

United States 
In the United States either a judicial or executive official designated by law issues an execution warrant. This is done when a person, in trial court proceedings, has been sentenced to death, after trial and conviction, and usually after appeals are exhausted.  Normally when a death warrant is signed and an execution date is set, the condemned person is moved from his or her death row cell to a death watch cell, which is typically located adjacent to the execution chamber. Usually, the government agency charged with carrying out an execution, normally the state's Department of Corrections or the Federal Bureau of Prisons in federal cases, has a limited time frame, normally about 60 days, from the date the warrant is signed, to complete the execution process, or the warrant expires and the condemned person is returned to the death row cell, awaiting another execution date.

Stays of execution can be ordered in state cases by the Governor of the State, a trial court, a state appeals court or state Supreme Court or a court in the federal judiciary (including the United States Supreme Court). In federal death penalty cases the trial court, appeals courts, the United States Supreme Court and President may grant a stay of execution. In all cases, the stay may be issued at any time, even when the condemned is being prepared for execution.

Setting of execution dates by jurisdiction

United Kingdom
Mary, Queen of Scots, whose death warrant was signed by Elizabeth I,  and King Charles I were among the most famous victims of death warrants in British history.

See also
 Bill of attainder (capital or other punishment of a specific person authorized by a legislature rather than a court) 
 Fatwa (in the western usage of the term to mean a religious warrant to kill)

Notes

References 
 
 

Capital punishment
Legal aspects of death
Warrants